Big Brother 2012 is the sixth season of the Swedish version of the reality television series, Big Brother. This season was launched on Sunday 19 February 2012, and aired on TV11 for 106 days with the finale held on 3 June 2012. The same host from last season, Gry Forssell, returned as host to this season. The season was won by the 29-year-old mother of two Hanna Johansson.

Housemates

The Loft
One day before the launch day, four potential housemates moved into a separate small house located directly on top of the House's roof called 'The Loft', where they stayed for four days while viewers could vote online of who among those four people would later move into the House and become a real housemate. The Loft consisted of Alexander "Acke" Pettersson, Jackie Ingevald, Joe Rovik and Ludvig Lannerås. After the four days spent inside the Loft, the voting closed and revealed Joe Rovik as the winner of the voting, and he moved into the House on Day 4.

Housemates
On Day 1, twelve of the original housemates entered the House, while three housemates (Kija, Hanna J, Juliana) entered the House during Days 2–4. One additional housemate (Joe) arrived in the House on Day 4, and another one (Marcelo) entered the House during the evening of Day 5. The next housemate (Lars) entered the House on the morning of Day 6. After Hannah W's departure, Rodney (from the previous season) entered the House on Day 22 and became a full housemate after the viewers took part in a vote to decide if he would stay or leave the next day, on Day 23. On the fifth live eviction night on Day 36, three new housemates (Jennifer, Vobban and Hulda) entered the House.

Nominations table

Undisclosed Nominations are represented by "N/A"
  Granted immunity from eviction.
  Automatic nomination (due to violation(s) committed, failure of task etc.); see notes.

External links
 Bigbrother.se
 World of Big Brother
 Official Facebook

2012 Swedish television series debuts
6
2012 Swedish television seasons